Rohr in Niederbayern is a municipality in the district of Kelheim in Bavaria in Germany.

Twin towns
Rohr in Niederbayern is twinned with:

  Castelcucco, Italy, since 2003

References

Kelheim (district)